Sol Halperin (February 16, 1902 – May 4, 1977) was an American special effects artist as well as a cinematographer. He was nominated at the 18th Academy Awards for Best Special Effects, for the film Captain Eddie. His nomination was shared with Fred Sersen, Roger Heman Sr. and Harry M. Leonard.

His nephew is Academy Award nominee Richard H. Kline.

Selected filmography

Special effects

Stanley and Livingstone (1939)
Fallen Angel (1945)
Leave Her to Heaven (1945)
Captain Eddie (1945)
Johnny Comes Flying Home (1946)
Centennial Summer (1946)

As a cinematographer

Wild West Romance (1928)
Girl-Shy Cowboy (1928)
Taking a Chance (1928) (as Sol Halprin)
Married in Hollywood (1929)
Double Cross Roads (1930)
The Robe (1953); co-developed the CinemaScope process with Gordon Laube and Earl Ira Sponable

References

External links

1902 births
1977 deaths
American cinematographers
Artists from Newark, New Jersey
Special effects people
Recipients of the Scientific and Technical Academy Award of Merit